Institute of Soil Science and Agrochemistry is a research institute in Akademgorodok of Novosibirsk, Russia. It was founded in 1968.

History
The institute was organized in 1968. It was created to study the soils of Siberia and the Russian Far East.

Scientific activity
The creation of new methods of soil and plant diagnostics, development of soil reclamation technologies etc.

Laboratories
 Laboratory of Agrochemistry
 Laboratory of Soil Biogeochemistry
 Laboratory of Biogeocenology
 Laboratory of Geography and Genesis of Soils
 Laboratory of Soil Physical Processes
 Laboratory of Soil Reclamation

References

External links
 Institute of Soil Science and Agrochemistry of the Siberian Branch of the RAS. SB RAS Organizations and Employees.

A
Biochemistry research institutes
Soil and crop science organizations
Research institutes established in 1968
Research institutes in the Soviet Union
Agriculture in the Soviet Union
1968 establishments in the Soviet Union